This is a list of films produced by the Tollywood (Telugu language film industry) based in Hyderabad in the year 1971.

References 

1971
Telugu
Telugu films